Radenković is a village in Serbia. It is located in the Sremska Mitrovica municipality, in the Srem District, Vojvodina province. The village has a Serb ethnic majority and its population numbering 1,086 people (2002 census). Although part of the Srem District, Radenković is situated in the region of Mačva.

Historical population

1961: 1,161
1971: 1,105
1981: 1,040
1991: 1,076

See also
List of places in Serbia
List of cities, towns and villages in Vojvodina

References
Slobodan Ćurčić, Broj stanovnika Vojvodine, Novi Sad, 1996.

Mačva
Populated places in Vojvodina
Sremska Mitrovica